Nigerians in Finland are residents and citizens of Finland of Nigerian ancestry. They are Finland's second largest African immigrant group after Somalis.

In 2017, the largest concentrations of them exist in Helsinki (962, 0.15%), Espoo (578, 0.21%), Vantaa (399, 0.18%), Tampere (245, 0.11%) and Turku (190, 0.10%). 2,110 of them reside in Uusimaa, where they make up 0.13% of the population.

Society
Many Nigerian women seeking asylum in Finland are victims of human trafficking.

Finnish people of Nigerian descent

 Noah Kin, rapper
 Nnaemeka Anyamele, footballer
 Nicholas Otaru, footballer
 Lola Odusoga, model
 Seppo Evwaraye, athlete

References

Ethnic groups in Finland
 
Islam in Finland
Muslim communities in Europe
Finland